Shanderman may refer to:
 Shanderman District
 Shanderman Rural District